is a former professional tennis player from Japan, mainly competing on the ITF Women's Circuit.

On 7 November 2011, she reached her highest singles ranking by the Women's Tennis Association (WTA) of 393. On 10 October 2016, she peaked at No. 139 of the WTA doubles rankings.

WTA 125 tournament finals

Doubles: 1 (title)

ITF finals

Singles: 5 (3–2)

Doubles: 21 (10–11)

External links
 
 

1987 births
Living people
Japanese female tennis players
Sportspeople from Kyoto